The Shwegyin Dam is a rock-fill dam on the Shwegyin River in Shwegyin Township of the Bago Region in Burma. The primary purpose of the dam is hydroelectric power generation and it has a  power station just below its base. Construction on the dam began in 2002, the first generator was operational in December 2010 and it was formally opened on 22 October 2011. It is owned by the Ministry of Electric Power and cost US$161 million to construct.

Gallery

See also

Dams in Burma

References

Dams completed in 2010
Energy infrastructure completed in 2011
Dams in Myanmar
Rock-filled dams
Hydroelectric power stations in Myanmar
Buildings and structures in Bago Region